Veterum Sapientia (English: "The Wisdom of the Ancients") is an apostolic constitution promulgated by Pope John XXIII on February 22, 1962 regarding the significance of Latin and other non-vernacular languages to the Catholic Church and in the priesthood.

Quotes
By the working of its nature, the Latin language is most suitable for furthering every kind of cultural initiative among all sorts of peoples, since it does not incite jealousy, but is equally accessible to every race of men. It is not partisan, but rather, favorable and welcoming to all. Nor would it be right not to mention that there exists in the Latin language an innate, noble harmoniousness and propriety – “a way of speaking which is dense with meaning, rich, and abundant, full of majesty and dignity.” It has qualities within it which are uniquely conducive both to clarity and to seriousness.

References

External links
 Veterum Sapienta at Vatican website
 Veterum Sapienta in English language at VeterumSapienta.org

1962 in Christianity
Documents of Pope John XXIII